Henry Howes (born 11 October 1928) was a British speed skater. He competed in four events at the 1948 Winter Olympics.

References

1928 births
Living people
British male speed skaters
Olympic speed skaters of Great Britain
Speed skaters at the 1948 Winter Olympics
People from Brentford